Michael Muller or Müller may refer to:

 Michael Müller (bobsleigh) (born 1976), Austrian Olympic bobsledder
 Michael Muller (field hockey) (born 1965), Canadian former field hockey player
 Michael Müller (writer) (1825–1899), American Catholic writer
 Michael Müller (handballer) (born 1984), German handballer
 Michael Müller (footballer, born 1944), German footballer
 Michael Müller (footballer, born 1964), German footballer
 Michael Müller (footballer, born 1989), German footballer
 Michael Müller (politician, born 1948), German politician 
 Michael Müller (politician, born 1964), German politician and mayor of Berlin
 Mike Muller (born 1971), American ice hockey player and coach